Ice chips are small pieces of ice, usually smaller than ice cubes. They are often recommended before surgery or an invasive medical procedure. They may help to prevent oral mucositis or mouth sores associated with high-dose chemotherapy.

See also
 Xerostomia
 Ice pack
 Pagophagia

References

Water ice
Surgery
Bartending equipment
Chemotherapy